Mohammad Reza Keyani (also Romanized as Moḩammad Rez̤ā Keyānī) is a village in Howmeh Rural District, in the Central District of Gilan-e Gharb County, Kermanshah Province, Iran. At the 2006 census, its population was 87, in 18 families.

References 

Populated places in Gilan-e Gharb County